Junípero Serra High School is a private, Roman Catholic high school in Gardena, California, a suburban city located 14 miles southwest from Downtown Los Angeles. Honored as a State School of the Year, Serra is operated by the Roman Catholic Archdiocese of Los Angeles.

Background

Junípero Serra High School was founded by James Francis Cardinal McIntyre in 1950. It is named for founder of the California Missions, Saint Junipero Serra.  The school, which was largely staffed by the Society of Mary graduated its first class in 1953.

Religious of the Sacred Heart and Sisters of St. Joseph of Carondelet and archdiocesan priests have also helped to staff the school at various times in its history. The Marianists left in 1994 due to lack of members to staff all their schools but they came back in 2014.

The current administration and faculty are predominantly lay women and men. Their dedication to the Catholic philosophy of education and values of the Gospel serves as an example for today's youth.

In addition to Gardena, the school also serves Carson, Compton, Hawthorne, Inglewood, Lawndale, Lennox, Los Angeles, Manhattan Beach, and Torrance. The students from the above places brings a diverse cultural and ethnic background which continues to enrich the traditions which begun in 1950.

Athletics

CIF and State Championships
Serra athletic programs have earned numerous California State and CIF-Southern Section titles. In the spring of 2013 the boy's track & field team set a record with 148 team points enroute to winning their 20th CIF Southern Section title, taking twelve out of the last fourteen. After narrowly missing the title in 2010 and 2012, the boys' track & field team finished a historic season by capturing the California Division 1 State Championship. The team finished with several individual state champions, making it their team second California Division 1 State Championship. In the Spring of 2012 the girls won the California Division 1 State Championship and their 4th consecutive CIF-Southern Section title.

Serra placed five top-20 records in California State High School Track & Field history in the 4 × 100-meter relay according to DyestatCal and ESPN, along with all-time marks in the 100-, 200-, and 400-meter sprints, 300 intermediate hurdles, discus, and 4X400 relay. The track program has also produced three (Division 1) State Coaches of the Year since the year 2000, and 19 individual (Division 1) State Champions in recent school history.

In December 2012, the Serra Cavaliers football team won the Division 2 California State title. They also won a Division 3 California State title in 2009, making that a total of two titles in four years.

This victory adds to the three CIF- Southern Section Championship titles that the Serra Cavaliers earned in football during the same four-year period. In the 2011-2012 academic year, Serra won four CIF Southern Section-Ford championships.

In 2010, Serra Basketball claimed the CIF-Southern Section and California State Boys' Basketball titles. The Boys' Basketball team has earned 2 California State titles in all-time school history. In 2014-2015, Serra competed in their first-ever CIF-Southern Section Swimming Championships meet and in the 2015-2016 swim season, Serra Swimming competed in their very first CIF-Southern Section State Championship meet. The Serra Cavalier Swim Team has been competing at CIF-Southern Section Swimming Championships since 13-14 swim season.

Since 1980, the school has won numerous state and CIF Championships, in addition to dozens and dozens of league titles:

1980: CIF-SS Boys' Track & Field
1981: CIF-SS Boys' Track & Field
1982: CIF-SS Boys' Track & Field
1989: CIF-SS Football
1993: State Champs Boys' Basketball, CIF-SS Boys' Basketball
1994: CIF-SS Boys' Track & Field
1996: State Champs Boys' Track & Field (4x100), CIF-SS Boys' Track & Field
1997: CIF-SS Boys' Track & Field
1998: CIF-SS Boys' Track & Field
1999: CIF-SS Boys' Basketball, CIF-SS Boys' Track & Field
2000: Division 1 State Champs Boys' Track & Field, State Champs Boys' Track & Field (100-meter dash, 4x100 relay, 4x400 relay), CIF-SS Boys' Track & Field,  CIF Regional Boys' Basketball, CIF-SS Boys' Basketball
2002: CIF-SS Boys'  Track & Field
2003: CIF-SS Boys' Track & Field,  CIF-SS Girls' Track & Field (first CIF Title for girls; was all-boys school until 1991)
2004: CIF-SS Boys' Track & Field
2005: CIF-SS Boys' Track & Field
2006: CIF-SS 'Basketball
2007: CIF-SS Boys' Track & Field
2008: CIF-SS Boys' Track & Field
2009: State Champs Football (Division III), State Champs Girls' Track & Field (4x400 relay) (400-meter sprint), State Champs Boys' Track (4x100 relay) CIF-SS Football (Northwest Division), CIF-SS Girls' Track & Field, CIF-SS Boys' Track & Field
2010: State Champs Boys' Basketball, State Champs Girls' Track & Field (400-meter dash), State Champs Boys' Track and Field (Boys' 4x400 relay), CIF-SS Boys' Track & Field, CIF-SS Girls' Track & Field, CIF-SS Boys' Basketball, CIF-SS Girls' Basketball, CIF-SS Football (Western Division),
2011: State Champs Girls' Track (4x400 relay), CIF-SS Boys' Track and Field, CIF-SS Girls' Track and Field, CIF-SS Boys' Basketball, CIF-SS Girls' Basketball, 
2012: State Champs Girls' Track,  State Champs Girls' Track (4x100 relay, 4x400 relay, 400-meter dash, Long Jump), State Champs Boys' Track and Field (110-meter hurdles, Long Jump), State Champs Football (Division II), CIF-SS Football (Western Division), CIF-SS Girls' Track, CIF-SS Boys' Track
2013: Division 1 State Champs Boys' Track, State Champs Boys' Track & Field:(Boys' 4x100 relay, Boys' 300 hurdles, Boys' 4x400 relay), State Champs Girls' Basketball, CIF-SS Boys' Track, CIF-SS Boys' Baseball
2016: Division 4AA CIF-SS Boys Basketball Champs
2018: Division 1 state Champs Girls’ Basketball, State Champs Girls’ Track & Field, Division 4 CIF Champs Girls’ Track & Field, Division 7 CIF Champs Girls’ Softball

School of the Year

In the 2009–2010 academic year, the Serra Cavaliers, who compete in the California Interscholastic Federation (CIF), became the first school in California history to win state football and basketball titles in the same academic year.  For this achievement, Serra was named "2009–2010 State School of the Year" by Cal-Hi Sports.  Based on school enrollment, Serra is the smallest school to ever receive this honor and the first State School of the Year recipient from the South Bay region of Los Angeles in 44 years.

Notable alumni
Brigadier General Michael J. Aguilar, (USMC) (ret.), Federal Security Director, San Diego International Airport
Bené Benwikere, NFL cornerback for the Dallas Cowboys
Kerry Boagni, former professional basketball player, Utah Jazz
Joseph D. Cormier, former professional football player, Minnesota Vikings and Los Angeles Raiders
George Farmer, NFL cornerback 
Skeme, rapper, performer
Deon Figures, former NFL defensive back, Pittsburgh Steelers; first round draft selection, 1993; winner of the Jim Thorpe Award
Dana Gioia, former Chairman, National Endowment for the Arts; and poet
Dwan Hurt, Serra basketball coach
Duke Ihenacho, former NFL strong safety, Washington Redskins
Adoree Jackson, 2016 Jim Thorpe Award winner at USC, selected in the first round (18th overall) of the 2017 NFL Draft to the Tennessee Titans
Pooh Jeter, professional basketball player, Sacramento Kings point guard
Montell Jordan, hip hop, R&B recording artist 
Jordan Lasley, NFL wide receiver, Baltimore Ravens
Marqise Lee, NFL wide receiver for Jacksonville Jaguars; 2012 winner of Biletnikoff Award at USC
Gary E. Liebl, Chair (ret.), QLogic; Chairman Emeritus, Chaminade University of Honolulu; Life Governor, Chapman University
 William D. McCann (Class of 1964 -SBP) Founder, Mount Diablo National Bank, Danville, CA, Founder, Go-Ped Europa Teoranta, Bunbeg, Gweedore, Ireland, Vice Chairman of the Board, ValleyCare Medical Systems, Livermore, CA, Poet Laureate, Bohemian Club of California
William Melville, founder, president and CEO (retired), Mayfair Plastics 
Myron Montgomery, Former Soul Train Dancer from 1976-1995
Dave Nelson, Major League Baseball All-Star infielder and FSN broadcaster for the Milwaukee Brewers
Milt Palacio, NBA point guard, currently plays in Greek League
Jemeel Powell, former NFL player
Arabian Prince, rapper, former N.W.A. member
Eugene Profit, CEO, Profit Investment Management; former NFL cornerback, New England Patriots, Washington Redskins
Terrence Quaites, R&B recording artist with Cash Money Records, musical artist
Kris Richard, NFL defensive coordinator of the Seattle Seahawks; former NFL defensive back, Seattle Seahawks, San Francisco 49ers
Paul Richardson, wide receiver, selected 45th overall by Seattle Seahawks in 2014 NFL Draft
Dominic Smith, outfielder for the New York Mets
Jashon Sykes, NFL linebacker (ret.), Denver Broncos and Washington Redskins
Sione Tuihalamaka, American football player
Jarrett Theragood, American Businessman
Theo Viltz, former NFL player
David Williams, played for the National Football League and the Canadian Football League
Marcus Wilson, MLB outfielder for the Seattle Mariners organization
Robert Woods, wide receiver, Tennessee Titans; track & field, 400 meter sprint; (2010) IAAF World Rank (Senior)

Notable faculty
Dwan Hurt, Serra basketball coach

References

High schools in Los Angeles County, California
Roman Catholic secondary schools in Los Angeles County, California
Catholic secondary schools in California
Gardena, California
Educational institutions established in 1950
1950 establishments in California